Bianca de' Medici (10 September 1445–1505) was a member of the de' Medici family, de facto rulers of Florence in the late 15th century. She was the daughter of Piero di Cosimo de' Medici, de facto ruler of the Florentine Republic, and sister of Lorenzo de' Medici, who succeeded his father in that position. She married Guglielmo de' Pazzi, a member of the Pazzi family. She was a musician, and played the organ for Pope Pius II and the future Pope Alexander VI in 1460; she was a landowner.

Life 

Bianca was a daughter of Piero di Cosimo de' Medici and Lucrezia Tornabuoni. In 1459, she married Guglielmo de' Pazzi, who was a childhood friend of her brother, Lorenzo de' Medici. This alliance was intended to help resolve the animosity between the families, but it was not successful in that regard as Machiavelli noted in his Florentine Histories. Their first child, Antonio, was born in 1460. The marriage agreement included a significant reduction in taxes imposed on the Pazzi family. In the aftermath of the Pazzi conspiracy of 1478, Bianca's marriage significantly softened Lorenzo's wrath towards Guglielmo, who was only put under house arrest for a time, while his male relatives were exiled or executed; his daughters were exempted from the marriage ban imposed on other Pazzi daughters.

In 1460, Bianca was asked to play the organ for Pope Pius II and his entourage during a visit to Florence, as the pope was coming back from the Council of Mantua. Teodoro Montefeltro, the Apostolic protonotary travelling with the pope, praised the performance in a letter to Barbara of Brandenburg, Marquise of Mantua. During the same papal visit, she performed a second concert for the future pope Rodrigo Borgia at his request. Bianca often performed for local and visiting dignitaries, contributing to her families' reputation and influence.

In 1475, Bianca asked her mother to purchase farmland from other relatives for her, as Lucrezia had more influence within the family. Though Bianca owned the property, it was managed by staff employed by her mother.

Issue 
Bianca and Guglielmo had sixteen children, nine sons and seven daughters: 

 Antonio de' Pazzi (1460), died as an infant

 Giovanna de' Pazzi, married Tommaso Monaldi in 1471

 Contessina de' Pazzi, married Giuliano Salviati in 1476

 Antonio de' Pazzi (1462-1528), ambassador and politician, Gonfaloniere di Giustizia in 1521, second Lord of Civitella 

 Alessandra de' Pazzi (1465), married Bartolomeo Buondelmonti in 1486

 Cosimo de' Pazzi (1466-1513), archbishop of Florence from 1508 until his death

 Piero de' Pazzi (1468), died as an infant

 Lorenzo Alessandro de' Pazzi, (1470-1535) merchant, patron of the arts and latinist

 Cosa de' Pazzi, married Francesco di Luca Capponi

 Renato de' Pazzi, goldsmith merchant

 Lorenzo de' Pazzi, politician and ambassador

 Luigia de' Pazzi, married Folco di Edoardo Portinari in 1494

 Maddalena de' Pazzi, married Ormanozzo Deti in 1497

 Alessandro de' Pazzi (1483-1530) ambassador, literate and greekist 

 Lucrezia de' Pazzi, married Cattani di Diacceto, and then a member of Martelli family (1500)

 Giuliano de' Pazzi (1486-1517), doctor of law, abbot and canon of the Metropolitan of Florence

References

Sources

1445 births
1488 deaths
15th-century people of the Republic of Florence
Italian women musicians
House of Medici
15th-century Italian nobility
15th-century Italian women
Medieval Italian women musicians
15th-century Italian musicians
15th-century women musicians